Bodil Bjarta Joensen (25 September 1944 – 3 January 1985) was a Danish pornographic actress born in the village of Hundige, near Copenhagen. She ran a small entrepreneurial farm and animal husbandry business, and enjoyed celebrity status from her many pornographic films in which she engaged in sex acts with animals.

An individual with a public profile for a time, with her own successful business, she failed to make the transition to more mainstream movies when market sentiment changed and she became impoverished and could no longer care for her animals. She became an alcoholic and died several years later.

Early life
The daughter of a devout Christian mother and an absentee military father, Joensen grew up in the Copenhagen suburb of Hundige. Her mother was often physically abusive, sometimes violently so, and would whip her. At the age of 12, her mother suspected her of having been raped by a stranger in a railway station — her Danish biography and 1980s interview say that they "just talked" or that she was "nearly raped", but her mother believed that she had actually been raped. On returning home to tell her mother, she was beaten and blamed for the incident. Seeking a means to retaliate, she vowed to her mother that when she grew up she would have sex with boars, commenting in an interview that her mother was "so shocked, she thought I was allied to the Devil". Turning to animals for affection, her dog became her best friend, companion and lover, and she wore a locket containing his picture for the rest of her life.

Initially, after leaving home at 15, Joensen found work on a farm in a conservative area of Denmark. Her landlord, the farmer Gunnar Nielsen, commented: "She was passionate about animals." He added that she was entranced by the sight of animals breeding, an activity she stated she found "wonderful" to help with. She later left to set up her own breeding farm, "Insemination Central," while Joensen became known for her ability to handle aggressive animals such as boars, and was then ruined by country gossip, spread principally by farmers' wives who were unhappy at the prospect of their husbands working with a young single girl on farm business. Friends, such as Johan Kirk, commented that she "was never given much of a chance" by such people. She commented later, "Nine out of ten men wanted to fuck me, and their wives hated me."

Pornography career
Launched in the context of a failing business and attempts to remain solvent in order to keep her livestock and home, her career in pornography began in 1962 at age 17, when she appeared in "light fetish" pornography, before establishing herself in the bestiality subgenre in 1969 at around age 25. She starred in a number of feature films and shorts for companies such as Color Climax Corporation, as well as for the pornographer Ole Ege, in which she and other actors had sex with various animal species. Between 1969 and 1972, she starred with animals in over 40 movies.

The movie A Summer's Day (1971) was released in the U.S. as Animal Lover (1970). She wrote a column answering readers' letters in SCREW magazine.

In this genre, Joensen drew special attention worldwide as the Boar Girl, a reputation earned from her live performances with swine, as well as her participation in films shot with pigs on her own breeding centre. The movies she appeared in combined a peculiar blend of the "tolerant contemporary Danish society" image and Scandinavian rustic nostalgia. Her Danish biography comments of her domestic life: "The scene is classic Rabelaisian more than anything else, harkening back to the Middle Ages when people and their animals often did live in the same house."

The award-winning documentary Bodil Joensen - en sommerdag juli 1970 (1970), by Shinkichi Tajiri, shows her living with her animals on her farm during this era, including their care, her affection for them, and her sexual life, entirely to the tune of Beethoven's Sixth Symphony (Pastoral)—an involuntary artistic choice that became necessary when the original soundtrack recordings became unavailable through a gaffe. At the time, she lived with "two rabbits, seven dogs, a dozen pigs, some cats, a guinea pig, a mare and a beautiful black stallion named Dreamlight". Her Danish biographer commented later that she seemed to be a very open, warm-hearted person, "very at home with nature": "When she plays her erotic game with the dog or horse, it is not only a sexual curiosity, it is an erotic play with animals she loves and who are devoted to her." The documentary was the surprising winner of the Grand Prize of the Wet Dream Film Festival, held in Amsterdam from 26–29 November 1970, where it premiered. Joensen immediately became an underground celebrity, and drew attention from other documentary makers as well as tourists towards her expanding farm.

Later life and death
By the early 1970s, Joensen had managed to achieve her goal of living on her own farm with her daughter (born c. 1972), as well with her companion/partner. Reference material suggests relationship roles, varying from companionship to partner. Some refer to Knud P. Andersen as a companion, some as a partner; one suggests platonic friendship. The source material is ambiguous. In The Dark Side of Porn: The Real Animal Farm, Joensen is quoted as saying "...I'm bored when I'm alone, and so is he, so we're good company for each other." Joensen helped finance the farm by allowing sex tourists to visit it and make private films with her animals.

Friends comment about that time that she was "easily exploited by almost anyone with a camera" and that the visitors "just wanted pornography; they didn't care about knowing her". Neighbours, once friendly, turned dark and hostile, forcing her to move repeatedly. As the Danish adult industry began looking to other content, Joensen failed to make the transition from porn to other movies, and her financial stability and life began to fall apart. After 1972, she experienced a sharp deterioration, undergoing very obvious physical and psychological changes, including depression, first working as a "live show" and "sexual roleplay" girl. By 1980, with little remaining means of income and spiralling debt, the only work she was able to retain was a hectic routine of small scale live shows most evenings. Tajiri commented, sadly: "Accepting the 'Grand Prix' at the first Wet Dream Film Festival was the worst mistake we made with our film, but we were too flattered by the response at the time to realize it".

Joensen commented in a 1980 interview:

Her life falling apart, Joensen became an alcoholic, and progressively less able to care for her animals. In 1981, following a change in Denmark's laws, she was raided for "sickening" animal neglect, and was imprisoned for 30 days. None of her animals ultimately survived, and Bodil herself did not recover after they were euthanised. With little left, she turned to street prostitution to support herself, her partner (an alcoholic himself) and daughter, although friends comment that even then, she did not want to be with people this way – all she wanted was her animals, as it once had been. Resorting to exchanging any sexual favour for alcohol and tranquilizers, she stated in her final interview that "in my position it is hard to turn down anything, no matter how disgusting... for me, staying alive in the hooking business is hell".

Joensen gave her last interview in 1980 and died in 1985. Many believed her to have committed suicide. However, the April 2006 British documentary titled The Dark Side of Porn: The Real Animal Farm traced the production of the underground film known as Animal Farm from excerpts of her many bestiality films. In this documentary, it was stated, by a close friend of Joensen's, that she died on 3 January 1985 from cirrhosis of the liver. She was 40 years of age at the time of her death.

References

External links

 
 

1944 births
1985 deaths
Deaths from cirrhosis
Danish female adult models
Danish pornographic film actresses
Zoophilia
Animal pornography
20th-century Danish actresses
Alcohol-related deaths in Denmark
People from Greve Municipality